Aaron's of Wick is a coach operator based in Wick, Scotland Owned and run by Aaron Wilson . It operates from a depot in Rutherford street wick. As of December 2022, the firm employed 25 people and had 22 vehicles This is due to the massive win on school and service work contracts.
The firm operates private hire coaches, school transport, and rail replacement buses. It also formerly operated the A9 service, a competitor to the X99 Inverness–Thurso that ran in 2019 and 2020.

References

Bus operators in Scotland
Wick, Caithness